Valtorta may refer to:

Places
Italy
Valtorta (valley), a valley in the Province of Bergamo
Valtorta, Lombardy, a comune in the Province of Bergamo

People
Maria Valtorta, an Italian writer and author of The Poem of the Man God